Médio Oeste is a microregion in the Brazilian state of Rio Grande do Norte.

Municipalities 
The microregion consists of the following municipalities:
 Campo Grande
 Janduís
 Messias Targino
 Paraú
 Triunfo Potiguar
 Upanema

References

Microregions of Rio Grande do Norte